Washington Township is a township in Jasper County, Iowa, USA.

History
Washington Township was established in 1861.

References

Townships in Jasper County, Iowa
Townships in Iowa
1861 establishments in Iowa